USS Mitscher may refer to:

, was launched in January 1952 and decommissioned in 1980
, is an  commissioned in 1994 and currently in active service

United States Navy ship names